Ernest Herbert ( – 18 September 1942) was an English professional rugby league footballer who played in the 1930s and 1940s.

Background
He died aged 28 at his home in Leeds, West Riding of Yorkshire, England.

Playing career

Club career
Herbert began his career at Hull in 1933, and played  in Hull FC's 10-18 defeat by Huddersfield in the 1938 Yorkshire County Cup Final during the 1938–39 season at Odsal Stadium, Bradford on Saturday 22 October 1938.

International honours
Herbert won caps for England while at Hull in 1936 against France, and in 1938 against France.

Background
Ernie Herbert was the older brother of the rugby league footballer who played in the 1940s for Hull FC; Harry Herbert

References

External links
 (archived by web.archive.org) Stats → Past Players → H at hullfc.com
 (archived by web.archive.org) Statistics at hullfc.com
Search for "Ernie Herbert" at britishnewspaperarchive.co.uk
Search for "Ernest Herbert" at britishnewspaperarchive.co.uk

1910s births
1942 deaths
Military personnel from Leeds
Year of birth uncertain
England national rugby league team players
English rugby league players
Hull F.C. players
Place of birth missing
Rugby league five-eighths
Royal Artillery soldiers
British Army personnel killed in World War II